Leila Hayes   is an Australian actress, actors agent, radio presenter, playwright, producer, singer  and drama teacher, she featured in the hit 1980s soap opera Sons and Daughters as Beryl Palmer (later Hamilton) throughout its entire run.

Biography 
She began her career as a singer. In the 1970s she acted on television in guest roles in Crawford Productions drama series Homicide, Division 4, Matlock Police, Bluey and Cop Shop, and appeared briefly in their acclaimed serial The Sullivans.

Hayes also acted in television miniseries, including Power Without Glory (1976), and in some TV movies. In 1981 she appeared in several episodes of soap opera Prisoner as brothel madam Jeannie Baxter and was in an early episode of A Country Practice. The same episode starred Peter Phelps who played her stepson John in Sons and Daughters only a few months later.

Hayes had also acted on stage, taking the leading role of April Delaney in comedy Dimboola. After this came the role in Sons and Daughters.
Leila ran a drama school for aspiring actors, called the "Leila Hayes drama Studio" in NSW . Hayes had a career in talkback radio for a while.

Filmography

FILM

TELEVISION

Notes

External links

Drama teachers
Living people
Australian soap opera actresses
Year of birth missing (living people)